Matthias Loy (March 17, 1828 - January 26, 1915) was an American Lutheran theologian in the Evangelical Lutheran Joint Synod of Ohio. Loy was a prominent pastor, editor, author and hymnist who served as president of Capital University, Columbus, Ohio.

Biography
Matthias Loy was the fourth of seven children of Matthias and Christina Loy, immigrants from Germany who lived as tenant farmers in the Blue Mountain area of Cumberland County, Pennsylvania.  In 1834, when Matthias was six years old, the family moved to Hogestown, a village nine miles west of Harrisburg, Pennsylvania. When he was fourteen, he was sent as an apprentice to Baab and Hummel, printers of Harrisburg. Here he worked for six years, while attending school. He received a classical education at Harrisburg Academy and graduated at Trinity Lutheran Seminary in Columbus, Ohio in 1849.

In 1849, he entered the Lutheran ministry and became pastor at Delaware, Ohio. In 1865 he resigned his pastorate to become professor in the Theological Seminary of Capital University, Columbus, Ohio. In 1881 he was elected president of Capital University.  Following a critical attack of angina pectoris, he retired as professor emeritus in 1902

Loy edited the Lutheran Standard, official periodical of the Evangelical Lutheran Joint Synod of Ohio, from 1864 until 1890.  In 1881, he founded the Columbus Theological Magazine and managed it for ten years.  He was President of the Ohio Synod from 1860 to 1878 and again from 1880 to 1894. In 1887, Muhlenberg College gave him the degree of Doctor of Divinity. He wrote twenty-one hymns and also translated a number of German hymns into the English language. He also edited a translation of Dr. Martin Luther's House Postil in 3 vols. (1874–1884).

He died in Columbus on January 26, 1915.

Works

Books
The Doctrine of Justification, (1862)
Life of Luther, translated (1869)
Essay on the Ministerial Office, (1870)
Sermons on the Gospels, (1888)
Christian Prayer, (1890)
Christian Church, (1896)
Story of My Life, (3rd ed. – 1905)
The Augsburg Confession, (1908)
The Sermon on the Mount, (1909)
Sermons on the Epistles, (1910)

Hymns
 The Law of God is Good and Wise
 The Gospel Shows the Father's Grace
 An Awe-full Mystery Is Here
 Jesus, Thou Art Mine Forever
 At Jesus' Feet Our Infant Sweet

See also
The Lutheran Hymnal contains several hymns either written or translated by Matthias Loy

References

Other sources
 Matthias Loy, Leader Of Ohio's Lutherans by C. George Fry, in the Scholarly Journal of the Ohio Historical Society, Volume 76, pages 183–201.  The reference notes for this article begin on page 267.
Matthias Loy, Theologian of American Lutheran Orthodoxy by C. George Fry, in the Springfielder, October 1974, Vol 38, Number 4.
 Dr. Matthias Loy and his role in the Election Controversy by Timothy Kant (WLS Essays.net)

Related reading
Nichol, Todd W.; Marc Kolden (2004) Called and Ordained: Lutheran Perspectives on the Office of the Ministry (Wipf and Stock Publishers)  
Fry, C. George; Joel R. Kurz (2005) The Americanization process in the second generation; the German Lutheran Matthias Loy (1828-1915) caught between adaptation and repristinization (Studies in religious leadership; v.2)

External links
Lutherans In America – The Synodical Conference on the website of the Wisconsin Evangelical Lutheran Synod

1828 births
1915 deaths
19th-century American Lutheran clergy
19th-century American poets
American educators
American Lutheran theologians
American people of German descent
Capital University people
American Lutheran hymnwriters
Muhlenberg College alumni
People from Cumberland County, Pennsylvania
Harrisburg Academy alumni